Juan Cruz Monteagudo (born 26 October 1995) is an Argentine professional footballer who plays as a defender for Italian  club Viterbese.

Career
Nueva Chicago was Monteagudo's first club. He became a senior member of their first-team during the 2015 Primera División campaign, though didn't appear in a matchday squad as the club was relegated to Primera B Nacional. He made his bow versus Independiente Rivadavia on 5 March 2016, prior to scoring his opening goal in April against Villa Dálmine in a 6–4 victory. Monteagudo featured nine times in 2016, the last appearance coming in a defeat to Crucero del Norte which he left after eighty-eight minutes via a straight red card. Forty-nine appearances occurred in the next three campaigns for the Mataderos outfit, along with one further goal.

June 2019 saw Monteagudo agree an eighteen-month loan deal with Deportes Puerto Montt, effective with the Chilean transfer window's opening on 23 July.

He then joined Catania of Italian Serie C in 2021. On 9 April 2022, he was released together with all of his Catania teammates following the club's exclusion from Italian football due to its inability to overcome a number of financial issues.

On 25 July 2022, Monteagudo signed with Serie C club Viterbese.

Career statistics
.

References

1995 births
Living people
People from San Martín, Buenos Aires
Sportspeople from Buenos Aires Province
Argentine footballers
Association football defenders
Primera Nacional players
Primera B de Chile players
Serie C players
Nueva Chicago footballers
Puerto Montt footballers
Catania S.S.D. players
U.S. Viterbese 1908 players
Argentine expatriate footballers
Expatriate footballers in Chile
Argentine expatriate sportspeople in Chile
Expatriate footballers in Italy
Argentine expatriate sportspeople in Italy